Kristian Nushi (born 21 July 1982) is a Kosovan professional footballer who plays as a midfielder for Swiss club FC Uzwil.

Club career

Early career
Nushi began his career at the Prishtina. In 1999, he moved to Switzerland and played for Spiez until 2002.

Wil

After playing well in Kosovo, Nushi was alerted to SWil in the Swiss Super League and was invited to take part in a week-long trial. On 1 July 2002. Nushi signed to for Wil and took part in the 2003 UEFA Intertoto Cup and became win the 2004 Swiss Cup.

Aarau
In summer 2007. Nushi signed to Swiss Super League side Aarau.

St. Gallen
On 30 May 2009. Nushi signed to Swiss Super League side St. Gallen.

Winterthur
In September 2014. Nushi signed to Swiss Challenge League side Winterthur.

Tuggen
On 15 February 2016. Nushi signed to Swiss Promotion League side Tuggen.

Uzwil
On 1 July 2016. Nushi signed to 2. Liga Interregional side Uzwil.

International career
On 15 June 2007. Nushi making his debut with Kosovo in a friendly match against Saudi Arabia and score his side's only goal during a 1–0 winning.

References

External links

1982 births
Living people
Sportspeople from Gjakova
Kosovo Albanians
Association football midfielders
Kosovan footballers
Kosovo international footballers
FC Prishtina players
FC Wil players
FC Aarau players
FC St. Gallen players
FC Winterthur players
FC Tuggen players
Kosovan expatriate footballers
Expatriate footballers in Switzerland
Kosovan expatriate sportspeople in Switzerland
Kosovo pre-2014 international footballers